Beit Lessin Theater (translit: Teatron Bet Lessin) is a theater in Tel Aviv, Israel.

History
The theater was established in 1980 by Yaakov Agmon for the Histadrut.

Over the years the theater has shown over a thousand contemporary American and European plays, as well as original productions. In 1993, Zippi Pines started managing the theater. It was separated from the Histadrut and started showing mostly original Israeli material reflecting the political and social situation in Israel.

In 2003, the theater moved from Lessin House to the old residence of the Cameri Theater after it was remodeled. This venue having more seats allowed larger and more expensive plays to be produced, such as Chicago and Guys and Dolls.

The theater's production "Mikveh" won the Israeli Theater Prize in 2005.

In 2020, the theater hosted the finish for HaMerotz LaMillion 8.

See also
Theater of Israel

References

External links
 Beit Lessin English Homepage

Theatre companies in Israel
Theatres in Tel Aviv
Arts organizations established in 1978